The 2011 Varsity Cup was contested from 7 February to 11 April 2011. The tournament (also known as the FNB Varsity Cup presented by Steinhoff International for sponsorship reasons) was the fourth season of the Varsity Cup, an annual inter-university rugby union competition featuring eight South African universities.

Competition

Varsity Cup
There were eight participating universities in the 2011 Varsity Cup. These teams played each other once over the course of the season, either home or away.

Teams received four points for a win and two points for a draw. Bonus points were awarded to teams that scored 4 or more tries in a game, as well as to teams that lost a match by 7 points or less. Teams were ranked by points, then points difference (points scored less points conceded).

The top 4 teams qualified for the title play-offs. In the semi-finals, the team that finished first had home advantage against the team that finished fourth, while the team that finished second had home advantage against the team that finished third. The winners of these semi-finals played each other in the final, at the home venue of the higher-placed team.

Varsity Shield
There were five participating universities in the 2011 Varsity Shield. These teams played each other twice over the course of the season, once at home and once away.

Teams received four points for a win and two points for a draw. Bonus points were awarded to teams that scored 4 or more tries in a game, as well as to teams that lost a match by 7 points or less. Teams were ranked by points, then points difference (points scored less points conceded).

The top two teams qualified for the title play-offs. The team that finished first had home advantage against the team that finished second.

Teams

The following teams took part in the 2011 Varsity Cup competition:

The following teams took part in the 2011 Varsity Shield competition:

Squads

Varsity Cup

Varsity Shield

Varsity Cup

Table

Fixtures and results
 Fixtures are subject to change.
 All times are South African (UTC+2).

Regular season

Round one

Round two

Round three

Round four

Round Five

Round Six

Round Seven

Play-off games

Semi-finals

Final

Honours

Top scorers
The following sections contain only points and tries which have been scored in competitive games in the 2011 FNB Varsity Cup.

Top points scorers

Source: South African Rugby Union

Top try scorers

Source: South African Rugby Union

Varsity Shield

Table

Fixtures and results
 Fixtures are subject to change.
 All times are South African (UTC+2).

Regular season

Round one

Round two

Round three

Round four

Round Five

Round Six

Round Seven

Round Eight

Round Nine

Round Ten

Play-off games

Final

Honours

Top scorers
The following sections contain only points and tries which have been scored in competitive games in the 2011 FNB Varsity Shield.

Top points scorers

Source: South African Rugby Union

Top try scorers

Source: South African Rugby Union

Promotion/relegation play-offs

 remain in the Varsity Cup competition and  remain in the Varsity Shield competition.

See also UJ team line up 
 2011 Currie Cup Premier Division
 2011 Currie Cup First Division
 2011 Vodacom Cup

References

 FNB Varsity Cup
 FNB

External links
 
 
 
 
 Official site
 Official site Varsity Shield page
 Sport24.co.za

2011
2011 in South African rugby union
2011 rugby union tournaments for clubs